"Ave Satani" is the theme song to the film The Omen (1976) composed by Jerry Goldsmith. The Omen won the Academy Award for Best Original Score, with Ave Satani nominated for Best Original Song.

History
The Latin title of Ave Satani (correct: Ave Satana) translates to "Hail Satan" in English. In an interview, Goldsmith says that his idea was to create a kind of Satanic version of a Gregorian chant and came up with ideas while talking with the London choir-master of the orchestra who was helping him. He decided to create something like a Black Mass, inverting Latin phrases from the Latin Mass. The choir-master, according to Goldsmith, was an expert in Latin and helped him come up with phrases; instead of saying "Hail Mary", they decided on "Hail Satan", and so on. The song contains various Latin phrases inverting Christ and the Mass, such as "Ave Versus Christi", meaning "Hail Anti-Christ", and "Corpus Satani", an inversion of "Corpus Christi", the body of Christ. The resulting lyrics are an inversion of the Roman Catholic rite of the consecration and elevation of the body and blood of Christ during the Mass (see Eucharist in the Catholic Church).

A version of the song has been produced by the band Fantômas, who altered some of the lyrics so that they mean "smallest blood, body spirit" rather than "we drink the blood, we eat the flesh," and added the word "Rotted". Other versions of the original song have been performed by the Italian vocalist Servio Tulio, and by Gregorian.  It has been used in mixes of sinister music and such a concept was made into an album by Van Helsing's Curse involving Dee Snider and other musicians, entitled Oculus Infernum.

Lyrics
The choir master's Latin contains a number of errors. Below are the Latin phrases which are repeated throughout the music, with their intended meaning, and a more correct Latin version:

See also

The Omen
Satanism
Black Mass
Ave Satanas

References

1976 songs
1976 compositions
Compositions by Jerry Goldsmith
Songs with music by Jerry Goldsmith
Choral compositions
Horror fiction
Film theme songs
The Omen (franchise)
Latin-language songs